Archeological Site No. LA 54050 is a prehistoric archaeological site in Hidalgo County, New Mexico. Another adobe block to the south of the main mound may contain another 50 rooms, though it has not been fully investigated. A lithic scatter is located to the west of the main site. Artifacts recovered from the site include ceramics, cobbles, and projectile points.

The site was added to the National Register of Historic Places on January 23, 1993.

See also

National Register of Historic Places listings in Hidalgo County, New Mexico

References

Archaeological sites on the National Register of Historic Places in New Mexico
Hidalgo County, New Mexico
Adobe buildings and structures in New Mexico
National Register of Historic Places in Hidalgo County, New Mexico